is a Japanese actress and model. She was scouted on a local street when she was in high school, and started working as a model for the local free newspaper, Niigata Bishōjo Zukan. Baba was also part of a young performers troupe called Apricot. Her acting debut was in the 2014 film Puzzle. She has expressed her admiration for the actress Fumi Nikaidō.

Filmography

TV series

Film

Awards

References

External links
 Official profile 
  (Line) 
  (Ameba) 

Actors from Niigata Prefecture
Japanese female models
Japanese film actresses
Japanese gravure models
Japanese television actresses
1995 births
Living people
Models from Niigata Prefecture
People from Niigata (city)
21st-century Japanese actresses